Charles Wetmore may refer to:

People
 Charles Wetmore (winemaker), American vintner and founder of Cresta Blanca Winery
 Charles D. Wetmore, partner of architectural firm Warren and Wetmore

Other
 SS Charles W. Wetmore, a whaleback freighter

Wetmore, Charles